Kate Eddy (born 28 December 1996) is an Australian netball player in the Suncorp Super Netball league, playing for the Melbourne Vixens.

Eddy was raised in Victoria, representing the state netball team at several underage levels before going on to play for the Victorian Fury in the Australian Netball League. In 2017 she was made a training partner at the Melbourne Vixens, though moved to Sydney to play for the Swifts in the Super Netball league during the 2018 season. She made her debut for the Swifts in round 1 of the season and played all 14 matches that year and was re-signed by the club ahead of the 2019 season. Eddy also represented Australia in the 2017 Netball World Youth Cup, where she was vice-captain.
In August 2019, Eddy was ruled out for the rest of the season with the Swifts, which saw them win their first premiership in 11 years. With Renae Ingles announcing her retirement from netball, Eddy was signed for the 2020 season with Melbourne Vixens, moving back to where she started her netball career. She has a sister called Rebecca Eddy. Rebecca is a teacher at Melbourne.

References

External links
 New South Wales Swifts profile

1996 births
Australian netball players
New South Wales Swifts players
Living people
Suncorp Super Netball players
Victorian Netball League players
Australian Netball League players
Victorian Fury players
Netball players from Melbourne
Melbourne Vixens players
Territory Storm players